Newark Tower is a large, ruined tower house standing in the grounds of Bowhill House, in the valley of the Yarrow Water three miles west of Selkirk in the Scottish Borders. In addition to the keep, sections of a gatehouse and wall survive. It has been designated a scheduled monument by Historic Environment Scotland.

History 
Newark Tower was granted to Archibald Douglas, Earl of Wigtown around 1423. It was incomplete at this time and work continued until about 1475. The surrounding barmkin was added around 1550, and the present battlements and two square cap-houses date from about 1600.

After the fall of the Black Douglases the Tower was held by the crown, and in 1473 it was given to Margaret of Denmark, wife of James III. The royal arms are visible on the west gable.

Margaret Tudor, wife of James IV and mother of James V, was given the tower of Newark with the lands and lordship of Ettrick forest as part of her marriage gift on 1 June 1503. She came to Newark in June 1532 to keep the Forest Court of Ettrick. The Laird of Buccleuch refused to give her the keys, until James V who was hunting at Cramalt in Meggotland sent confirmation. Margaret gave the keys to her husband Lord Methven.

Newark was unsuccessfully besieged by an English army in 1547, but was burnt the following year. Sir Walter Scott of Branxholme was made Keeper and Captain of Newark, and Baillie and Chamberlain of Ettrick Forest in December 1573.

In 1645, during the Wars of the Three Kingdoms, 100 royalist followers of the Marquis of Montrose were shot in the barmkin of Newark after the Battle of Philiphaugh. The Tower is believed to be haunted by the souls of the 300 slaughtered women and children also murdered at the site after the battle, whose cries are heard each year on September 13.

The Tower was altered for Anne Scott, 1st Duchess of Buccleuch at the end of the 17th century. It was visited by Sir Walter Scott and William and Dorothy Wordsworth in 1831.

Walter Scott framed the story of The Lay of the Last Minstrel there.

See also 
 Treasure Houses of Britain – 1985 TV series that shows the castle as backdrop to introduction of Buccleuch family in Programme 2

References

Bibliography 

 
 

Castles in the Scottish Borders
Scheduled Ancient Monuments in the Scottish Borders
Newark Tower, Selkirkshire
Yarrow Valley
Reportedly haunted locations in Scotland
Tower houses in Scotland